Hamzehabad (also Romanized as Ḩamzehābād) is a village in Mangur-e Sharqi Rural District of Khalifan District of Mahabad County, West Azerbaijan province, Iran. At the 2006 National Census, its population was 495 in 84 households. The following census in 2011 counted 477 people in 98 households. The latest census in 2016 showed a population of 469 people in 128 households; it was the largest village in its rural district.

References 

Mahabad County

Populated places in West Azerbaijan Province

[[Category:Populated places in Mahabad County